Roland Huber (born 25 April 1931) is a Swiss sprint canoer who competed in the early 1960s. At the 1960 Summer Olympics in Rome, he was eliminated in the repechages of both the K-1 1000 m event and the K-1 4 × 500 m event.

References
Roland Huber's profile at Sports Reference.com

External links
 

1931 births
Canoeists at the 1960 Summer Olympics
Olympic canoeists of Switzerland
Possibly living people
Swiss male canoeists